Yeshiva of Far Rockaway (also known as Yeshiva Derech Ayson and Derech Ayson Rabbinical Seminary) is a yeshiva located at 802 Hicksville Road, Far Rockaway, Queens in New York City. It comprises a high school, beis medrash, and Kollel. The school was founded by the current rosh yeshiva, Rabbi Yechiel Yitzchok Perr, and by the late Rabbi Nachman Bulman.  It has intensive Talmudic studies, and features the rosh yeshiva's musar lectures in the Novardok tradition. The yeshiva also has a kollel, Kollel Ner Rochel Leah, where Talmudic studies are continued after marriage.

History 
Rabbi Perr, an alumnus of Yeshiva Beis Yosef-Novardok in Brooklyn, Beth Medrash Govoha, the Talmudical Yeshiva of Philadelphia, and Mesivta Yeshiva Rabbi Chaim Berlin, founded the Yeshiva of Far Rockaway in 1969. The name of the yeshiva, Derech Ayson, comes from the sefer by Rabbi Avraham Yoffen of Novardok.

The yeshiva's principal from 1970 until his death was Rabbi Aaron Brafman, older brother of Benjamin Brafman.

Notable alumni 
 Avi Berkowitz, Special Representative for International Negotiations under President Donald Trump
 Rabbi Azriel Brown, Rosh Yeshiva, Yeshiva Gedola of Carteret
 Rabbi Yaakov Mayer, Rosh Yeshiva, Yeshiva Gedola of Carteret
 Ari Goldwag, Jewish recording artist, songwriter, and producer
 Rabbi Ezra Schwartz, Rosh Yeshiva, Yeshiva University
 Rabbi Chaim Steinmetz, Senior Rabbi, Congregation Kehilath Jeshurun

References 

Mesivtas
Orthodox yeshivas in New York City
Private high schools in Queens, New York
Rockaway, Queens
Boys' schools in New York City